FOSS Movement in India refers to the campaign across the country during the 1990s and 2000s in particular, to promote Free and Open Source Software. It was marked by the existence of many Indian Linux User Groups (ILUGs) groups and Free Software User Groups (FSUGs) in different cities, town and other areas.

The prominent members of the campaign include the late Atul Chitnis, Prof Nagarjuna G. and others.

Timeline of the campaign

External links
FSF India's Response to the Proposed Framework by Govt of India

References

Free software movement
Science and technology in India
History of technology
 History of India